Madoff is a surname that may refer to:

 Bernie Madoff (1938–2021), American criminal whose US$65 billion Ponzi scheme employed many family members, including:
 Ruth Madoff (born 1941), American bookkeeper and wife of Bernie Madoff 
 Mark Madoff (1964–2010), American financier and son of Bernie Madoff
 Andrew Madoff (1966–2014), American financier and son of Bernie Madoff
 Shana Madoff (born 1967), American attorney and niece of Bernie Madoff
 Michelle Madoff (1928–2013), American politician; Pittsburgh councilwoman from 1978 to 1993

See also
 Madoff (miniseries), a 2016 television miniseries about Bernie Madoff